The WTA Elite Trophy is the second-tier year-end professional women's tennis tournament on the WTA Tour. It is the successor event of the different format WTA Tournament of Champions, which took place from 2009–14.

The Elite Trophy takes place at the end of each season, in two disciplines: singles and doubles. The singles event features 12 players (11 of them ranked from 9th to 19th on the final table of the WTA ranking, and one wildcard). The players are split into four groups of three, with the group winners advancing to the single elimination semifinals. The doubles championships features six teams in two groups with the group winners contesting the final.

The inaugural edition was held in 2015, offering $2.15 million in prize money. Zhuhai, China hosted the WTA Elite Trophy for the first five years until 2019.

Venues

Past results

Singles

Doubles

See also
WTA Finals
WTA Tournament of Champions

References

External links
Official Website 

 
WTA Tour
Tennis tournaments in China
Sport in Zhuhai
Hard court tennis tournaments
Indoor tennis tournaments
Recurring sporting events established in 2015
2015 establishments in China
Sports competitions in Guangdong